Sinapalo or Sinapalu is a village on the island of Rota in the Northern Mariana Islands. The village is the largest settlement on the island  (followed by Songsong, in the southwest), it is located south of the island's airport, Rota International Airport, close to the centre of the island.

Demographics 
According to the Saipan Tribune, Sinapalo had a population of 1,297 in 2012, making up just over half of the island of Rota's population of 2,527.

Education
Commonwealth of the Northern Mariana Islands Public School System
 Sinapalo Elementary School is in Sinapalo
 Previously Rota Elementary & Junior High School in Songsong had elementary classes. Sinapalo Elementary was built in two phases, with the Rota government and Rota Resort Hotel financing it. In 1995 phase I was built. There was a four-year hiatus in the construction that ended when the Rota government allowed it to continue. The school opened in February 2002 when phase II was built.
 Dr. Rita Hocog Inos Jr./Sr. High School in Songsong serves Sinapalo

References

Towns and villages in the Northern Mariana Islands
Rota (island)